Kana Tomizawa (born 6 July 1999) is a Japanese judoka. She won the gold medal in the women's lightweight (–57 kg) event at the 2019 Summer Universiade held in Naples, Italy. She also won the gold medal in the women's team event.

In 2019, she won the silver medal in the women's –57 kg event at the Asian-Pacific Judo Championships held in Fujairah, United Arab Emirates.

References

External links 
 

Living people
1999 births
Place of birth missing (living people)
Japanese female judoka
Universiade medalists in judo
Universiade gold medalists for Japan
Medalists at the 2019 Summer Universiade
21st-century Japanese women